The Oriental Telephone Company was established on January 25, 1881, as the result of an agreement between Thomas Edison, Alexander Graham Bell, the Oriental Bell Telephone Company of New York and the Anglo-Indian Telephone Company, Ltd. The company was licensed to sell telephones in Greece, Turkey, South Africa, India, Japan, China, and other Asian countries.

References 

Companies established in 1881
Alexander Graham Bell
Thomas Edison
Telecommunications companies of the United States